The 2009–10 Indian Federation Cup (known as Hero Honda Federation Cup for sponsorship reasons) was the 31st season of Indian Federation Cup. East Bengal defeated Shillong Lajong on penalties to win the competition in the final for their sixth time and earned a place in the 2010 AFC Cup.

Group stage

Group A

Group B

Venue : Satindra Mohan Dev Stadium, Silchar

Group C

Group D

Venue : Nehru Stadium, Guwahati

Semi-finals
In what was seen as a major upset, Shillong Lajong defeated defending I-League champions Churchill Brothers 1–0 in the first semi-final, thereby qualified for the final for their first time. East Bengal beat Mohun Bagan to make their 13th appearance in the final of the competition.

Final

References

External links
 31st Federation Cup 2009/10 at Rec.Sport.Soccer Statistics Foundation

Federation Cup
Indian Federation Cup seasons
2009–10 domestic association football cups